Edwin Vinson Goddard (October 28, 1914 – July 20, 1992) was an American football player.  Goddard played college football at the quarterback and halfback positions for Washington State University.  Goddard also served as a punter for Washington State.  He was named a first-team All-American quarterback three straight years from 1934–1937 and was a consensus All-American quarterback in 1935 and 1936.  He was the second player selected in the 1937 NFL Draft and played two years of professional football for the Brooklyn Dodgers (1937) and Cleveland Rams (1937–1938).

Goddard was known as the "Escondido Express," as he grew up in Escondido, California. He reportedly received the nickname from a Los Angeles Times reporter who saw him running and passing against USC, helping Washington State win against USC for the first time in three years.

During World War II, Goddard served in the military.  He and his wife, Ellen Goddard, had two children.  Goddard died of cancer at his home in July 1992 at age 77.

References

1914 births
1992 deaths
American football quarterbacks
Washington State Cougars football players
Brooklyn Dodgers (NFL) players
Cleveland Rams players
American military personnel of World War II
Sportspeople from Escondido, California
Players of American football from San Diego
Deaths from cancer in California